Stigmella neodora is a moth of the family Nepticulidae. It is known from Karnataka in India.

References

Nepticulidae
Moths described in 1918
Endemic fauna of India
Moths of Asia